The Jameh Mosque of Raqqeh is a historic mosque in  Raqqeh, South Khorasan Province, Iran. The mosque dates from the 6th and 7th centuries of the Islamic calendar.

References

Gallery 

Mosques in Iran
Mosque buildings with domes
National works of Iran
Raqqeh